Boffalora d'Adda is a comune (municipality) in the Province of Lodi in the Italian region Lombardy, located about  southeast of Milan and about  northwest of Lodi.

Boffalora d'Adda borders the following municipalities: Zelo Buon Persico, Spino d'Adda, Dovera, Galgagnano, Lodi, Montanaso Lombardo.

References

External links
 Official website

Cities and towns in Lombardy